The 1929 West Virginia Mountaineers football team represented West Virginia University as an independent during the 1929 college football season. In their fifth season under head coach Ira Rodgers, the Mountaineers compiled a 4–3–3 record and were outscored by opponents by a combined total of 95 to 77. They played their home games at Mountaineer Field in Morgantown, West Virginia. Marshall Glenn was the team captain.

Schedule

References

West Virginia
West Virginia Mountaineers football seasons
West Virginia Mountaineers football